Jonathan Erlich and Andy Ram were the defending champions.

Erlich and Ram successfully defended their title, defeating Igor Kunitsyn and Dmitry Tursunov 6–3, 6–2 in the final.

Seeds

  Jonathan Erlich /  Andy Ram (champions)
  Stephen Huss /  Wesley Moodie (semifinals)
  Jaroslav Levinský /  Robert Lindstedt (first round)
  Ashley Fisher /  Jordan Kerr (first round)

Draw

Draw

External links
 Draw

Nottingham Open
2006 ATP Tour
2006 Nottingham Open